Gavanlu may refer to:
 Gavanlu, East Azerbaijan (گونلو - Gavanlū)
 Gavanlu, Asadabad, Hamadan Province (گوانلو - Gavānlū)
 Gavanlu, Razan, Hamadan Province (گونلو - Gavanlū)